Call recording hardware, or a telephone recorder, is hardware that can be used to record telephone conversations.  Call recording hardware is most often used by law enforcement, lawyers, journalist, and call centers to record phone transaction with customers.

History 

Law enforcement professionals began using hardware to record telephone calls in the 1890s. This required physical access to the lines over which calls were carried.  

PBX based call-recording hardware is sold by PBX vendors and third parties.  This hardware is attached to the PBX.  It can be configured to record all calls or some calls, either randomly or on demand.  Businesses, particularly call centers, use call recording for training, quality management, and legal compliance.

Consumer call-recording hardware was introduced in the 1970s, along with the first consumer-grade answering machines. These devices were connected to the same physical line as one of the telephones involved in the conversation.  While the more sophisticated devices were automatically activated when a call was made, most were manual.

Modern Call recorders are usually Windows Server 2003 / 2008 based servers utilizing specific Dialogic (Intel) cards that are designed for TDM T1 and ISDN-PRI trunks for trunk side recording, and analog and digital station side cards for recording from stations. Often client software is required by the user computer for both screen recording and to trigger voice recording. You can Also record SIP trunks using port spans installed on specially configured network ports that do not have IP addresses and are used as sniffers for SIP traffic, and can be configured to record all or only specific calls.  Most use informix and SQL databases and may use Integration Servers  and IP Analyzers as well, sometimes clustered on one machine.

Modern recorders include Digital Loggers, Verint, Witness, NICE, Call Copy, VersaDial, SIP Print, OrecX and many others.  Securelogix voice firewalls can function as recorders, too.

Uses

Law enforcement
Law enforcement use of call recording hardware is concentrated in two areas:
1. Homeland Security
Homeland security recording involves interception of domestic and international calls. The US government records calls in several agencies as legally permitted.  Hardware used in this application generally consists of large banks of servers and disk arrays.
2. E-911 call centers and Public Service Access Points (PSAPs)
With the advent of E-911 and P.25 projects, PSAPs are upgrading their recording hardware.  Newer systems include hardware interfaces to improve inter-operability and compatibility with radio systems outside the PSAP (i.e. military radios).  Newer law-enforcement recording systems include hardware interfaces to these radios.

Types

Cassette tape 

Cassette tape recorders, like answering machines, are installed between the telephone wall socket and the telephone itself.  Telephone calls flow through the recorder.  If the recorder is on, the call is recorded.  Recordings are made to magnetic tape and can be replayed on other compatible devices.

Digital 

Digital recorders have largely replaced tape recorders.  They work exactly the same way, but, instead of recording onto a magnetic tape, they record onto digital media.  Digital recorders are capable of recording call metadata such as, call time, call length, and caller ID. 

Advanced features include:

 The ability to copy files onto removable media such as memory sticks,
 automatic upload to a PC, and
 automated transcriptions of recorded calls.

PC 

The need to transfer call files from a recorder to a PC for review and analysis is completely eliminated if a PC is used instead of specialized hardware.  This is possible if a PC is equipped with a sound board through which calls can be run.  Calls can be terminated on a standard telephone or the PC itself.  Calls and call metadata are store on the PC's hard drive.

PC-based call-recording usually includes software to retrieve and review recorded calls.

Recent developments 

Call-recording services now make it possible for consumers and businesses to record their telephone calls without any hardware.  These services are available on demand.  They centralize recordings, usually making them available through a web portal, facilitating retrieval and review.

See also 

 Telephone tapping
 Call-recording software
 Call-recording services
 Voicemail
 Visual voicemail
 Business telephone system

Notes

External links 
 
 Recording directly by Microphone

Call recording
Telephone tapping